Lies My Father Told Me  is a 1960 film directed by Don Chaffey. It stars Harry Brogan and Betsy Blair.

Plot

This film follows Jewish people in Dublin; in a working-class family, a young boy becomes increasingly close to an old orthodox Jew and assimilates his views, much to the dismay of his family.

Cast
Harry Brogan as Grandfather
Betsy Blair as Mother
Eddie Golden as Father
Rita O'Dea as Grandmother
Terry Raven as David

References

External links

1960 films
Films directed by Don Chaffey
British drama films
1960 drama films
1960s English-language films
1960s British films